Maximilian Gosseau de Henef (also spelled Coseaux and de Heneff) was an Austrian architect of Alsatian descent.

He designed Star fort Tvrđa in Osijek, in today's Croatia. Gosseau took over planning of the fort when construction was already underway. Gosseau had to tackle quite a few problems. He owed his renown to their solution, which distinguished the Tvrđa as a specific ensemble from other fortifications of the time.

Gosseau de Henef died in 1741 and was buried in a village Nuštar in eastern Croatia, where he owned lands since 1717.

Notes

Austrian architects
1741 deaths
Year of birth missing